Tim Seely (born 10 June 1935) is an English film, radio, television and theatre actor.

Early life and education 

Seely is the son of the late Major Frank James Wriothesley Seely (1901–1956), and a great-grandson of Sir Charles Seely, 1st Baronet. His mother was Vera Lilian Birkin, daughter of British Colonel Charles Wilfred Birkin (fourth son of a lace embroidery and tableware magnate of Nottingham, Sir Thomas Isaac Birkin) and his American wife, Claire Lloyd Birkin (née Howe).  His aunt was Freda Dudley Ward, a mistress of King Edward VIII and wife of William Dudley Ward.

Seely studied at London's Royal Academy of Dramatic Art.

Career
In 1957, he made his theatre debut in the play Tea and Sympathy at the London Comedy Theatre. Seely played the young Tom Lee, who fell in love with the senior Laura, played by Elizabeth Sellars. He played the same role in the adaption at New Shakespeare Theatre, Liverpool. There he also played Rodolfo in Arthur Miller's A View From the Bridge. In 1958, he acted alongside Maggie Smith at the London St Martin's Theatre in an adaption of The Stepmother.

Seely was member of the BBC Radio Drama Company, with which he acted the title role in Pericles, Prince of Tyre. He also had roles in various Shakespeare plays, including as Baptista in The Taming of the Shrew, Capulet in Romeo and Juliet, Polonius in Hamlet, Leonato in Much Ado About Nothing and the King of France in All's Well That Ends Well.

In the late 1950s, he also took roles in film and television productions. One of his more prominent roles was as Midshipmen Ned Young in the 1962 version of Mutiny on the Bounty, where Seely appeared alongside Marlon Brando and Trevor Howard.

Filmography and television work

1958: Sally's Irish Rogue – Luke Carey
1958–1960: Armchair Theatre (television series, three episodes) – Albert Strachan / Seamus MacGonigal / Ralph
1959: The Offshore Island (TV Movie) – James Verney
1960: Please Turn Over – Robert Hughes
1960: The Mystery of Edwin Drood (television series, five episodes) – Edwin Drood
1962: Mutiny on the Bounty – Midshipman Edward 'Ned' Young
1979: Agatha – Capt. Rankin
1979–1981: Play for Today (television series, three episodes) – Andrew Oliphant, Father / Major / Captain Jennings
1985: Laughterhouse – Landowner
1985: Plenty – Sir Charles Curry
1990: Strike It Rich – Arnold
1991: King Ralph – King of England
1993: Lipstick on Your Collar (television series, two episodes) – Brigadier
1995: Annie: A Royal Adventure! (TV Movie) – The King
2004: Vanity Fair – Doctor
2006: Tess: A Tale of Love and Darkness (Short) – Old Man (final film role)

See also

 List of British actors
 List of Royal Academy of Dramatic Art alumni

References

External links 
 
 
 

Place of birth missing (living people)
1935 births
20th-century English male actors
21st-century English male actors
Alumni of RADA
English male film actors
English male radio actors
English male stage actors
English male television actors
Living people
English male Shakespearean actors